Joseph James Kelly (April 23, 1900 – November 25, 1967) was an American professional baseball player who appeared in 97 games as a pinch hitter, outfielder and first baseman in the Major League Baseball for the  and  Chicago Cubs.

Kelly's pro career lasted for 11 seasons, 1921 through 1931. He played two full seasons for the Cubs, with a year as member of the 1927 Toledo Mud Hens of the minor-league American Association sandwiched in between. He batted .335 in 65 games as a rookie in 1926, but only .212 in his sophomore campaign two years later. In his 97 major-league games over two seasons, Kelly posted a .307 career batting average (70-for-228), with 19 runs, 16 doubles, three triples, one home run and 39 RBI.

References

1900 births
1967 deaths
Albany Senators players
Chicago Cubs players
Jersey City Skeeters players
Major League Baseball outfielders
New Haven Bulldogs players
New Haven Profs players
Norfolk Tars players
People from Lynbrook, New York
Reading Aces players
Reading Keystones players
Baseball players from New York City
Toledo Mud Hens players
Toronto Maple Leafs (International League) players